The Botiz is a left tributary of the river Lăpuș in Romania. It flows into the Lăpuș near Strâmbu-Băiuț.

References

Rivers of Romania
Rivers of Maramureș County